James Wharram (15 May 1928 – 14 December 2021) was a British multihull pioneer and designer of catamarans.

Polynesian beginnings
Wharram was born in Manchester, England. In 1953, after long studies into the records of boats of the Pacific in the libraries and museums of Britain, and inspired by Eric de Bisschop's book The voyage of the Kaimiloa, he designed and built the first British ocean-going double-canoe-catamaran, the Tangaroa (length ) and in 1955–56 sailed with Jutta Schultze-Rohnhof and Ruth Merseburger, across the Atlantic to Trinidad – the beginning of cruising and transatlantic crossing with a catamaran.

No scholars in the Western world at this time believed that the Polynesians had boats capable of directed ocean voyages. Wharram believed otherwise and set out to prove it by doing it himself. He followed this first Atlantic crossing by building a 40-foot V-hull double canoe, Rongo, in Trinidad in 1957–58, with Bernard Moitessier's help, and sailing her across the North Atlantic in 1959 from New York to Ireland. This was the first west-to-east crossing of the Atlantic by catamaran or multihull.

The story was told by Wharram in the 1969 book Two Girls Two Catamarans.

From 1973 Wharram was assisted by his co-designer Hanneke Boon. In 1987-92 James and his partners built a new flagship, the 63-foot catamaran Spirit of Gaia, which they sailed into the Pacific and round the world, to study Indo-Pacific canoe-craft (1994–98).

The Lapita Voyage
In 2008–09 James Wharram and Hanneke Boon conceived the Lapita Voyage expedition, sailing two double canoes based on traditional Polynesian hullform and crab claw sails, from the Philippines to Tikopia and Anuta in the Solomon Islands. The ‘Lapita Voyage’ was a major expedition in Experimental Marine Archaeology. It was the first exploration of one possible migration route into the Central Pacific by Ethnic sailing craft.

Wharram catamaran designs
Wharram designs are inspired by Polynesian double canoes and typically have an open deck, with small deckpod(s) for crew shelter. Wharram combined boat building with studies of Polynesian culture. Most modern catamarans are built as a single rigid structure thereby sustaining greater forces and stresses in waves, whereas on Wharrams the separate hulls are connected to the crossbeams with (synthetic) rope lashings, in true Polynesian style. The flexibility of the Wharram system makes the boats suffer less stress in ocean waves. 

Wharram's designs covered a range of sizes from the  Hitia to the  Pahi 63 Gaia.

The rig on Wharrams since the early 1980s is the 'Wharram Wingsail Rig', an appropriate tech squareheaded rig with low turbulence pocket round the mast and a short adjustable gaff at the head. The advantages of this rig are simplicity, low turbulence and the fact that it can be lowered in a following wind at any time. The Centre of effort on all Wharram rigs is kept low, giving them very good stability.  No full-size Wharram has been known to have capsized.

Many of the cabin interiors are designed to flexy-space principles, the concept being multi-purpose space on a human scale, in which less is more and the simpler the construction, the better. The slim v-shaped hulls have a very good speed/length ratio and all have canoe sterns, giving minimum drag, even when loaded. This hullshape requires no keels or boards to sail to windward, giving hulls with little draft and easy beachability. Wharram also keeps freeboards low for minimum windage.

Personal life and death
Wharram died on 14 December 2021, at the age of 93.

Memberships

 1967 – 2021: British Marine (formerly the British Marine Industries Federation, BMIF).
 1968 – 2021: Polynesian Catamaran Association (PCA). Founding Member.
 1968 – 1975 Multihull Offshore Cruising and Racing Association (MOCRA). Founding Member.
 1968 – 1978 Little Ship Club.
 1973 – 2021: Royal Yachting Association (RYA).
 1977 – 1991 Committee member of the RYA Cruising Committee
 1992 – 2021: Andean Explorer’s Club. Honorary Member.
 1996 – 2021: Roskilde Vikingship Museum friends.
 2000 – 2021: Cruising Association.
 2005 – 2021: Association of Yachting Historians.
 2009 – 2021: Member of the Royal Geographical Society.
 2013 – 2021: Ocean Cruising Club.

Publications 
 Ocean-going catamarans. 1962. Ciba Technical Notes 231, Cambridge, UK
 Two Girls, Two Catamarans, 1969. Story of Ruth and Jutta, the Tangaroa and the Rongo
 Tehini. October 1970, Yachting Monthly, UK. Seminal article on Design approach.
 The Stable Multihull.  1976. (Researched for 1st World Multihull Symposium, Toronto.)
 The Sailing Community. 1978, Wooden Boat, USA, Prize-winning proposal for ‘Waterborne International Communities’.
 Catamaran Stability – Figures, Facts and Fictions. 1991. Practical Boat Owner, UK. Also published in several other countries.
 Nomads of the Wind. October 1994. Practical Boat Owner, UK. Analysis of the sailing qualities of the Polynesian Double Canoe.
 The Wharram Design Book: Build Yourself a Modern Sea - Going Polynesian Catamaran, 1996
 Going Dutch: The Tiki Wing Sail Rig. 1998, Practical Boat Owner, UK. Also published in several other countries, incl. Australia, Holland and France.
 Lessons from the Stone Age Sailors, A Study of Canoe Form Craft in the Pacific and Indian Ocean.
 Vikings go Home, November 2008. Classic Boat, UK. (Article about voyage of the 100 ft Vikingship reconstruction ‘Seastallion’ from Dublin to Denmark).
People of the Sea, December 2020, Lodestar Books, UK (with Hanneke Boon). Autobiography.

See also
 List of multihulls

References

External links

 Official site
Lapita Voyage

1928 births
2021 deaths
20th-century_sailors
British yacht designers
Circumnavigators_of_the_globe
Designers from Greater Manchester
Multihull designers
Multihulls